The Gingham Girl is a 1927 American comedy film directed by David Kirkland and written by David Kirkland, Rex Taylor and Ewart Adamson. It is based on the 1922 play The Gingham Girl by Daniel Kusell. The film stars Lois Wilson, George K. Arthur, Charles Crockett, Hazel Keener, Myrta Bonillas and Jerry Miley. The film was released on July 16, 1927, by Film Booking Offices of America.

Cast       
Lois Wilson as Mary Thompson
George K. Arthur as Johnny Cousins
Charles Crockett as Pat O'Day
Hazel Keener as Letty O'Day
Myrta Bonillas as Sonia Mason
Jerry Miley as Harrison Bartlett
Betty Francisco as Mazie Le Lewer
Derelys Perdue as Mildred Ripley
Jed Prouty as Hayden
Maude Fulton as Mrs. Trask

References

External links
 

1927 films
1920s English-language films
Silent American comedy films
1927 comedy films
Film Booking Offices of America films
American silent feature films
American black-and-white films
Films directed by David Kirkland
1920s American films